Klobouky u Brna is a town in Břeclav District in the South Moravian Region of the Czech Republic. It has about 2,400 inhabitants.

Administrative parts
The village of Bohumilice is an administrative part of Klobouky u Brna.

References

External links

Cities and towns in the Czech Republic
Populated places in Břeclav District
Moravian Slovakia